The Well-Digger's Daughter may refer to:

 The Well-Digger's Daughter (1940 film), by Marcel Pagnol
 The Well-Digger's Daughter (2011 film), by Daniel Auteuil